The following list of PC games contains an alphabetized and segmented table of video games that are playable on the PC, but not necessarily exclusively on the PC. It includes games for multiple PC operating systems, such as Windows, Linux, DOS, Unix and OS X. This list does not include games that can only be played on PC by use of an emulator.

List 

Note this page only covers games beginning with A. Use the table of contents for more.

A

See also 
 Index of Windows games (A)
 List of best-selling PC games
 List of free PC games
 List of video game emulators
 Lists of video games

References 

Lists of PC games